Columbkille is a civil parish and townland in County Kilkenny, Ireland. Located near Thomastown, it is in the historical barony of Gowran. Evidence of historical settlement in Columkille townland itself include a number of fulacht fiadh sites, a reputed holy well, and a graveyard and ruined church in an ecclesiastical enclosure. Other townlands within Columbkille civil parish include Ballyroe, Carrickmourne, Dangan, Jackstown, Kilcullen, Kiljames (Upper and Lower), Kilmurry, Ruppa and Mungmacody.

References

Civil parishes of County Kilkenny